Forisomes are proteins occurring in the sieve tubes of Fabaceae. Their molecules are about 1-3 µm wide and 10-30 µm long. They expand and contract anisotropically in response to changes of electric field, pH, or concentration of Ca2+ ions. Unlike most other moving proteins, the change is not dependent on ATP.

Forisomes function as valves in sieve tubes of the phloem system, by reversibly changing shape between low-volume ordered crystalloid spindles and high-volume disordered spherical conformations. The change from ordered to disordered conformation involves tripling of the protein's volume, loss of birefringence present in the crystalline phase, 120% radial expansion and 30% longitudinal shrinkage. In Vicia it was shown that forisomes are associated to the endoplasmic reticulum at sieve plates. There are evidences that the forisomes's behavior could depend on Ca2+ changes provoked by Ca2+-permeable ion channels, located on the endoplasmic reticulum and plasma membrane of sieve elements. responsible for shape changes.

Forisomes have possible applications as biomimetic smart materials (e.g. valves in microdevices) or smart composite materials.

References

External links
 Forisome: A smart plant protein inside a phloem system
 Forisome based biomimetic smart materials
 Forisome Protein, a Key to Biomimetic Materials

Motor proteins
Smart materials
Plant proteins